Geane Carlos Herrera (born May 27, 1990) is an American mixed martial artist competing in the Flyweight division. He is probably best known for his stint in the Ultimate Fighting Championship (UFC).

Background
Herrera was born in Duarte, California, but moved to Cali, Colombia with his mother and sister when he was a baby. The family lived there for nine years before returning to the United States.

Mixed martial arts career
Herrera made his professional mixed martial arts debut in March 2011.

He competed primarily for regional organizations in the Southeastern United States where he amassed an undefeated record of 8–0, before signing with the UFC on the heels of a first round finish of Josh Rave in July 2014.

Ultimate Fighting Championship
Herrera made his promotional debut against Ray Borg on August 8, 2015 at UFC Fight Night 73. He lost the fight by unanimous decision.

Herrera was tabbed as a short notice replacement to face Joby Sanchez on December 11, 2015 at The Ultimate Fighter 22 Finale, where he filled in for Justin Scoggins.  After a back-and-forth two rounds, Herrera earned a TKO finish in the final minute of the second round.

Herrera next faced Ali Bagautinov on June 18, 2016 at UFC Fight Night 89. He lost the fight via unanimous decision.

Herrera faced Ben Nguyen on November 27, 2016 at UFC Fight Night 101.  He lost the fight via unanimous decision and was subsequently released from the UFC.

Post-UFC career
Over a year removed from his release, Herrera would go on to face Darren Mima at ACB 85 on April 21, 2018. He won the fight via first-round submission.

Bare knuckle boxing
In 2019, Herrera participated in BKFC tryouts and received a contract to the organization. He was scheduled to make his debut against Abdiel Velazquez at BKFC 8 on October 19, 2019. However, the bout did not materialize due to an unknown reason.

Herrera eventually made his debut on July 23, 2021 at BKFC 19. He faced Abdiel Velazquez	and won the fight via TKO in the second round.

Personal life
Herrera has a son (born 2007).

Mixed martial arts record

|-
|Win
|align=center|10–3
|Darren Mima	
|Submission (rear-naked choke)
|ACB 85
|
|align=center|1
|align=center|1:53
|Rimini, Italy
|  
|-
|Loss
|align=center|9–3
|Ben Nguyen
|Decision (unanimous)
|UFC Fight Night: Whittaker vs. Brunson
|
|align=center|3
|align=center|5:00
|Melbourne, Australia
|  
|-
|Loss
|align=center|9–2
|Ali Bagautinov
|Decision (unanimous)
|UFC Fight Night: MacDonald vs. Thompson
|
|align=center|3
|align=center|5:00
|Ottawa, Ontario, Canada
|
|-
|Win
|align=center|9–1
|Joby Sanchez
|TKO (punches)
|The Ultimate Fighter: Team McGregor vs. Team Faber Finale
|
|align=center|2
|align=center|4:28
|Las Vegas, Nevada, United States
|
|-
|Loss
|align=center|8–1
|Ray Borg
|Decision (unanimous)
|UFC Fight Night: Teixeira vs. Saint Preux
|
|align=center|3
|align=center|5:00
|Nashville, Tennessee, United States
|
|-
|Win
|align=center| 8–0
|Josh Rave
|TKO (punches)
|RFA 25
|
|align=center|1
|align=center|4:09
|Sioux Falls, South Dakota, United States
|
|-
|Win
|align=center| 7–0
|Seth Marquez
|Submission (triangle choke)
|Conflict MMA 21
|
|align=center|1
|align=center|2:13
|Savannah, Georgia, United States
|
|-
| Win
|align=center| 6–0
|Josh Mercado
|Submission (rear-naked choke)
|Real Fighting Championships 30
|
|align=center|1
|align=center|1:50
|Tampa, Florida, United States
|
|-
| Win
|align=center| 5–0
|Mitchell Chamale
|Decision (unanimous)
|Real Fighting Championships 28
|
|align=center| 3
|align=center| 5:00
|Tampa, Florida, United States
|
|-
| Win
|align=center| 4–0
|Jared Crawford
| Submission (triangle choke)
|Real Fighting Championships 27
|
|align=center|1
|align=center|2:39
|Tampa, Florida, United States
|
|-
| Win
|align=center| 3–0
|Calvin Martin
| Submission (rear-naked choke)
|Real Fighting Championships 24
|
|align=center|1
|align=center|0:57
|Tampa, Florida, United States
|
|-
|Win
|align=center| 2–0
|Jovan White
|Submission (rear naked-choke)
|AOF 12
|
|align=center|1
|align=center|2:16
|Jacksonville, Florida, United States
|
|-
|Win
|align=center| 1–0
|Andrew Connors
|Decision (unanimous)
|Real Fighting Championships 23
|
|align=center|3
|align=center|5:00
|Tampa, Florida, United States
|
|-

Bare knuckle boxing record

|-
|Win
|align=center|1-0
|Abdiel Velazquez
|TKO (punches)
|BKFC 19
|
|align=center|2
|align=center|0:14
|Tampa, Florida, United States

See also

 List of current UFC fighters
 List of male mixed martial artists

References

External links
 
 

Living people
1990 births
American male mixed martial artists
American people of Colombian descent
Flyweight mixed martial artists
Mixed martial artists utilizing Brazilian jiu-jitsu
Mixed martial artists from Florida
Sportspeople from Tampa, Florida
People from Duarte, California
Ultimate Fighting Championship male fighters
American practitioners of Brazilian jiu-jitsu